The 1927 Millsaps Majors football team was an American football team that represented Millsaps College as a member of the Southern Intercollegiate Athletic Association (SIAA) during the 1927 college football season. In their sixth year under head coach Herman F. Zimoski, the team compiled a 3–8 record.

Schedule

References

Millsaps
Millsaps Majors football seasons
Millsaps Majors football